Religion and Dharma (1915) is a book written by Sister Nivedita. In this book Nivedita has discussed on the common principles of individual and social growth according to the law of Dharma.

Theme 
Nivedita travelled to India in 1898. She was closely in touch with student community  of India, especially Bengal. Generally Indian word Dharma is translated to English as Religion, but, in this book author has these two are different and how Dharma has a larger and more complex significance. This book is a collection of essays. In this book author has discussed on several aspects on Hinduism like Hindu Rituals, Mukti, "Hinduism and Organization", sectarianism, renunciation, religion and national success etc.

References

External links 
 Full book at Archive.org

1915 non-fiction books
Books by Sister Nivedita
English-language books
20th-century Indian books